Loepantheraea is a genus of moths in the family Saturniidae first described by Lambertus Johannes Toxopeus in 1940.

Species
Loepantheraea rosieri (Toxopeus, 1940)

References

Saturniinae
Taxa named by Lambertus Johannes Toxopeus